This is a list of Monuments of National Importance (ASI) as officially recognized by and available through the website of the Archaeological Survey of India in the Indian union territory Delhi. The monument identifier is a combination of the abbreviation of the subdivision of the list (state, ASI circle) and the numbering as published on the website of the ASI. 174 Monuments of National Importance have been recognized by the ASI in Delhi.

List of monuments of national importance 

|}

See also 
 List of Monuments of National Importance in India for other Monuments of National Importance in India
 List of State Protected Monuments in Delhi

Footnotes and references

External links 
 Archaeological  Sites of Delhi IGNCA
 Qutub Minar

Delhi
Monuments of National Importance
Monuments of National Importance
Lists of tourist attractions in Delhi